Yoraidil Pérez is a Panamanian footballer who plays as a midfielder. She has been a member of the Panama women's national team.

International career
Pérez first capped for Panama at the senior level during the 2014 CONCACAF Women's Championship qualification.

See also
 List of Panama women's international footballers

References

Living people
Women's association football midfielders
Panamanian women's footballers
Panama women's international footballers
Year of birth missing (living people)